Bonaventura Moreno was a rear admiral of the Spanish Navy. In 1781, he blockaded the British-held island of Menorca and soon took part in the Great Siege of Gibraltar as commander of the floating batteries. However, the Spanish and French forces were repulsed and the siege was a costly defeat for the allies.

Spanish military personnel of the American Revolutionary War
Spanish admirals
Year of birth missing
Year of death missing